Sun Valley High School (SVHS) is a public high school in Union County, North Carolina.  Sun Valley is part of Union County Public Schools.  It is located between Monroe and Indian Trail.

History 
Sun Valley was founded in 1961. For decades, it was the only high school in western Union County.  Three new high schools have been built in the area since the 2000s, partially relieving the crowded conditions that had plagued the school for many years.

The school presently serves all of Wesley Chapel, eastern Indian Trail, eastern Weddington and part of western Monroe. This was a result of redistricting on behalf of the Union County Public School board.

Sports 

Sun Valley is part of the North Carolina High School Athletic Association (NCHSAA). They are currently a 4A school and compete in the Southern Carolina 3A/4A Conference. The schools team name are the Spartans, with the school colors being maroon and gold.

 The boys' track and field team won the state 3A championship in 1987.
 The girls' track and field team won the 3A state championship for five consecutive years (1989–1993).
 The wrestling team won 3A state championship several times in the early 1990s.
 The boys' cross country team won the 3A state championship eight times between 1986 and 1999.
 The girls' winter track team were the state champions in the 4-by-8 relay.

Notable alumni 
 Sam Howell (2019), American football player
 Claire Ritter (1970), musician

References

External links 
 Sun Valley High School website
 Sun Valley Athletic Booster Club

1961 establishments in North Carolina
Educational institutions established in 1961
Public high schools in North Carolina
Schools in Union County, North Carolina